Heinrich Hoffman was born on December 23, 1836. He served in the American Civil War, and was a Medal of Honor Recipient. He served as a Corporal in the Union Army in Company M, 2nd Ohio Cavalry. He received the Medal of Honor for action on April 6, 1865, at the Battle of Sayler's Creek, Virginia.

He is buried at Old St. Joseph's Cemetery in Cincinnati, Ohio.

Medal of Honor citation
His citation reads "Capture of flag."

See also
 List of Medal of Honor recipients

Notes

References

 Chester, Henry Whipple. Recollections of the War of the Rebellion:  A Story of the 2nd Ohio Volunteer Cavalry, 1861–1865 (Wheaton, IL:  Wheaton History Center), 1996.  
 
 Gause, Isaac. Four Years with Five Armies: Army of the Frontier, Army of the Potomac, Army of the Missouri, Army of the Ohio, Army of the Shenandoah (New York:  The Neale Publishing Company), 1908.
 Hatton, Robert W. William James Smith's Memoirs of the Second Ohio Volunteer Cavalry Company M (Milford, OH:  Little Miami Pub. Co.), 2008.  
 List of Skirmishes, Battles and Raids, Second Ohio Cavalry, Twenty-Fifth Ohio Battery, 1861–1865 (Cleveland, OH:  s.n.), 1898.
 
 
 Report and Minutes of the Re-Union of the 2nd Ohio Cavalry and 25th Ohio Battery, Held at Youngstown, Ohio, Oct. 10, 1907 (S.l.:  s.n.), 1907.
 Report of the Reunion:  The 2nd Ohio Cavalry, 25th Ohio Battery, Held at Cleveland, Ohio, October Nineteenth, 1915 (Cleveland, OH:  2nd Ohio Volunteer Cavalry Association), 1915.
 Roberts, Joseph N. Reminiscences of the Civil War (S.l.:  s.n.), 1925.  [author was a private in Company M]
 Second Regiment Ohio Cavalry, 25th Battery:  Stenographic Report of Proceedings of the Thirty-Eighth Reunion Held at Cleveland, Ohio, September 30, 1903 (Cleveland, OH:  O. S. Hubbell Print. Co), 1903.
 
  
 
 
 
 

1836 births
1894 deaths
People of Ohio in the American Civil War
United States Army soldiers
United States Army Medal of Honor recipients
Military personnel from Cincinnati
American Civil War recipients of the Medal of Honor
Burials at Old St. Joseph's Cemetery
German emigrants to the United States